This is a round-up of the 1980 Sligo Senior Football Championship. St. Mary's retained the title after defeating Eastern Harps in the most one-sided final in the competition's history.

Quarter finals

Semi-finals

Sligo Senior Football Championship Final

References

 Sligo Champion (July–September 1980)

Sligo Senior Football Championship
Sligo Senior Football Championship